The Mountain Warfare Training Center (MWTC) is a United States Marine Corps installation located in Pickel Meadows on California State Route 108 at  above sea level in the Toiyabe National Forest,  northwest of Bridgeport, California. The training center exists to train units in complex compartmented terrain.

Mission
The Marine Corps' Mountain Warfare Training Center, as a major subordinate element of Marine Air Ground Task Force Training Command, and with support from Marine Corps Installations West, conducts unit and individual training courses to prepare USMC, Joint, and Allied Forces for operations in mountainous, high altitude, and cold weather environments in support of the Regional Combatant Commanders. Additionally, MWTC provides support to Marine Corps Combat Development Command (MCCDC); Training and Education Command; Marine Corps Systems Command; and other USMC and Department of Defense (DOD) agencies engaged in the development of war-fighting doctrine and specialized equipment for use in mountain and cold weather operations.

History

The Mountain Warfare Training Center (MWTC) is one of the Corps' most remote and isolated posts. The center was established in 1951 as the Cold Weather Battalion with a mission of providing cold-weather training for replacement personnel bound for Korea. After the Korean War, in 1963, the school was renamed the "Mountain Warfare Training Center" due to its expanded role. During the 1980s, the Training Center's focus was on training and preparing Marines and operational units for deployments on NATO's Northern flank, particularly Norway. Recently, with the Global War on Terrorism, the MWTC provided pre-deployment training in support of Operation Enduring Freedom—the war in Afghanistan.

Operating areas

Other areas utilized by MWTC: Sweetwater Airstrip , Mount Shasta , the eastern slopes of the Sierra Nevada (U.S.) and Hawthorne Army Depot for live fire exercises.

Installation capabilities
Billeting facilities to support 1200+ training personnel
Chowhall to support permanent and training personnel
Naval Hospital Branch Clinic
Mountain Warfare Fire & Emergency Services
Base Security Forces / PMO
Classrooms and base theater
1007' VSTOL-capable Expeditionary Airfield (EAF)
Fleet of BV 206 restricted terrain vehicles Bandvagn 206
Stables and pack animals
Specialized technical mountaineering and ski equipment
Modern Range Operations Center
Multiple small arms ranges
Multiple rock climbing training areas
Multiple stream crossing sites
Ski Lift
Avalanche training site
Unit/Combat Operations Center
MCCS, Post Exchange, Single Marine Program, Fitness Center and Rock Training/Climbing wall
The Pickel Post, Base Newsletter
Family Housing for Permanent personnel

School of Mountain Warfare

Formal courses and training programs offered

Mountain Communications Course
Mountain / Cold Weather Pre-Environmental Training
Mountain Operations Staff Planning Course
Summer and Winter Mountain Leader Courses
Mountain / Cold Weather Scout Sniper Course
Assault Climber Course
Scout Skier Course
Mountain / Cold Weather Survival Course
Mountain / Cold Weather Medicine Course 
OSV (Over the Snow Vehicle) / rough terrain driver training
Animal Packing Course
Special Operation Forces (SOF) Horsemanship Course
 Mountain / Winter Engineer Course
Most courses require a first class Physical Fitness Test, typically conducted on Training Day 1.

Pre-Deployment Training Programs (PTP)

Mountain Exercise (MTX) (revamped summer/winter package customized per METL) (2010–present)
Training for all USMC MAGTF elements/units for OEF
Mountain Warrior
Training for USMC battalions headed to Afghanistan to participate in combat operations in support of OEF. Exercise Mountain Warrior was directed by the Commandant of the Marine Corps as an alternate training venue to Exercise Mojave Viper (EMV) (Mojave Viper) due to insufficient throughput capacity of EMV at Marine Corps Air Ground Combat Center Twentynine Palms. (2009–2010)
Mountain Viper 
Training for USMC Embedded Training Teams (ETTs) for OEF (2006–2009)

MWI (Mountain Warfare Instructor, a.k.a. Red Hats) Training

Basic MWI
MLC or IQC (Instructor Qualification Course) Graduate, Seasonal
BIC (Basic Instructor Course)
SAT (Systems Approach to Training) and ORM (Operational Risk Management) Online Courses
ORM (Operational Risk Management)
RSO (Range Safety Officer)
225 score on the United States Marine Corps Physical Fitness Test (PFT) unadjusted for age or altitude
Recommendation from Course Chief

Senior MWI

Summer and Winter Mountain Leader Course (or IQC)
Completed AIARE Level 1 Avalanche Course
Qualify as a BSI (Basic Ski Instructor) 
Complete Snow II Clinic
Complete Rock II Clinic
Complete Alpine II Clinic
Certified as a Wilderness First Responder or higher
Completed 20 hours of platform Instruction
Recommendation from OIC.

Master MWI
Completed AIARE Avalanche Level 2 or Level 1 Instructor Course 
Qualify as a MSI (Military Ski Instructor). 
Complete Snow III Clinic
Complete Rock III Clinic
Complete Alpine III Clinic
Completed 40 hours of platform Instruction 
Recommendation from OIC.

See also
 List of mountain warfare forces
 List of United States Marine Corps bases
 Ski warfare
 Winter warfare
 Mountain warfare
 Mountain Leader
 US Navy Mountain Warfare Training Camp Michael Monsoor
 US Army Mountain Warfare School
 US Army Northern Warfare Training Center
 British Army Mountain Leader Training Cadre
  Nepal Army High Altitude and Mountain Warfare School, Mustang
 Indian Army High Altitude Warfare School (HAWS) in Sonamarg
 Russian Hatsavita Mountain Warfare Training Centre
 French Army Chasseurs Alpins, High Mountain Military School
 Italian Alpini
 German Gebirgsjäger
 Polish Podhale rifles
 Romanian Vânători de Munte

References

External links
 

Buildings and structures in Mono County, California
MWTC
United States Marine Corps schools
United States Marine Corps
1951 establishments in California